Ținutul Nistru was one of the ten ținuturi ("lands") of Romania, founded in 1938 after King Carol II, initiated an institutional reform by modifying the 1923 Constitution and the law of territorial administration. It comprised most of Bessarabia (including parts of the Budjak), and its name was derived from the Dniester River. Its capital was the city of Chișinău. Ținutul Nistru ceased to exist following the territorial losses of Romania to the Soviet Union in June 1940.

Coat of arms
The Coat of Arms is party per pale. The dexter consists of a gules field bearing an argent castle (probably depicting the citadel of Cetatea Albă) over waves argent and azure (standing for either the Black Sea or the Dniester). The sinister field consists of four bars, two of gules and two of argent, the former four counties of Greater Romania (71 in total) which it included.

Former counties incorporated
After the 1938 Administrative and Constitutional Reform, the older 71 counties lost their authority. 
Cetatea-Albă County
Lăpușna County
Orhei County
Tighina County

See also
 Historical administrative divisions of Romania
 History of Moldova
 History of Romania

External links
Map

 
Bessarabia
Nistru
Geographic history of Moldova
1938 establishments in Romania
1940 disestablishments in Romania
States and territories established in 1938
States and territories disestablished in 1940